Pavel Viktorovich Bugalo (born 21 August 1974) is an Uzbekistani former footballer who played as a goalkeeper.

Club career
He was awarded the Uzbekistan Footballer of the Year title in 1996 and 1997, while playing for Pakhtakor. He later played in Russia with Alania Vladikavkaz and in Kazakhstan, where he became cup champion in 2002 with Zhenis Astana. In 2007-2010 he played for Bunyodkor where he won in 2008 Uzbek championship and Cup. In 2011, he moved to another capital club, Lokomotiv Tashkent and played there 3 seasons. In December 2013 he left Lokomotiv, moving back to Bunyodkor and signed a contract with club.

International career
Bugalo has made 40 appearances for the full Uzbekistan national football team between 1995 and 2007.

Honours

Club

Pakhtakor
Uzbek League (2): 1992, 1998
Uzbek League runner-up (1): 1993
Uzbek Cup (2): 1993, 1997

Zhenis
Kazakhstan Cup (1): 2002

Bunyodkor
Uzbek League (1): 2008
Uzbek League runner-up (1): 2007
Uzbek Cup (1): 2008,

Lokomotiv
Uzbek League runner-up (1): 2013

Individual
Uzbekistan Footballer of the Year (2): 1996, 1997

References

External links
Pavel Bugalo at playerhistory.com

1974 births
Living people
People from Chirchiq
Soviet footballers
Uzbekistani footballers
Soviet Union youth international footballers
Uzbekistan international footballers
1996 AFC Asian Cup players
2000 AFC Asian Cup players
2007 AFC Asian Cup players
Pakhtakor Tashkent FK players
FC Spartak Vladikavkaz players
FC Zhenis Astana players
FC Zhetysu players
FC Ordabasy players
FK Andijon players
PFC Lokomotiv Tashkent players
Expatriate footballers in Kazakhstan
Expatriate footballers in Russia
FC Bunyodkor players
Russian Premier League players
Kazakhstan Premier League players
Uzbekistani expatriate sportspeople in Kazakhstan
Uzbekistani expatriate sportspeople in Russia
Uzbekistani people of Russian descent
Association football goalkeepers
Footballers at the 1998 Asian Games
Asian Games competitors for Uzbekistan